Balleray is a former commune in the Nièvre department in central France. On 1 January 2017, it was merged into the new commune Vaux d'Amognes.

Population

See also
Communes of the Nièvre department

References

Former communes of Nièvre
Populated places disestablished in 2017